Here We Stand is the second studio album by Scottish rock band The Fratellis, released on 9 June 2008. Self produced by the band in their own studio in Scotland, Here We Stand reached and peaked at number five in the UK Albums Chart on 15 June 2008.

Each single released off the album included three B-sides (except for "A Heady Tale" which only included two). Tell Me a Lie was featured on the EA Sports title FIFA 09, while "My Friend John" was on Forza Motorsport 3.

Track listing

Deluxe Edition
As well as containing the entire album on a CD with bonus track "Moriarty's Last Stand", the deluxe edition also contained a DVD with the following:
 The Year of the Thief (Documentary)
 Live from Abbey Road (contains "Mistress Mabel", "Flathead" and "Milk and Money")
 Music Videos (contains "Mistress Mabel" and "Look Out Sunshine!")
 Live at the Fillmore, San Francisco (contains entire concert footage)

Personnel

Band
 Jon Fratelli – Guitar, Piano, Vocals
 Barry Fratelli – Bass guitar
 Mince Fratelli – Drums

Additional Personnel
 Manager: Anthony McGill @ Numb Music
 Design: Traffic
 Cover Photography: Chip Simons
 Band Photography: Scarlett Page
 Logo: Mark James

Production
 The Fratellis - Producer
 Tom Lord-Alge - Mixing engineer
 Giles Hall and Paul Stacey - Mixing engineer for "Jesus Stole My Baby" at Strangeways studio, London
 Giles Hall - Mixing engineer for "Moriarty's Last Stand" at Cava Studios, Glasgow
 Giles Hall and Stuart McCredie - Engineer, assisted by Alan Moffat
 Recorded at The Playground, Glasgow
 Published by EMI Music Publishing
 Mike Mooney - Executive Producer for Island Records

Deluxe Version Credits
 Justin Kreutzmann - Editor and Director of "The Year of the Thief Documentary"
 Live at the Fillmore - Produced by Kendra Wester, Edited by Seb Lloyd and Sian Fever, Audio Recorded by Tony Brooke.
 Abbey Road - Produced by Michael Gleason and Peter van Hooke for Live from Abbey Road Ltd.

Charts

References

External links
Here We Stand review: Daily Music Guide

2008 albums
The Fratellis albums